Jenni Pirita Susanna Kangas (born 3 July 1992) is a Finnish track and field athlete who competes in the javelin throw. In 2016, she finished ninth at the European Championships. In 2017, she won bronze at the Summer Universiade, throwing a personal best 60.98 m. She is coached by her father, retired javelin thrower Hannu Kangas.

International competitions

Personal bests

References

External links 
 

1992 births
Living people
Finnish female javelin throwers
People from Seinäjoki
Universiade medalists in athletics (track and field)
Universiade bronze medalists for Finland
Competitors at the 2015 Summer Universiade
Medalists at the 2017 Summer Universiade
Sportspeople from South Ostrobothnia